Alpari may refer to:

 Alpari (UK) Limited a global foreign exchange (FX, Forex), precious metals and CFD broker
 Alpari World Match Racing Tour, a professional sailing series sanctioned by the International Sailing Federation
 Gyula Alpári a Hungarian Communist politician and propagandist